Lina Haag née Jäger (18 January 1907 – 18 June 2012) was a German anti-Fascist activist.

Early life

Haag was born in Hagkling, and was a member of the Youth movement of the Communist Party of Germany (KPD) in the small Württembergish town of Schwäbisch Gmünd in the 1920s. In 1927, she married fellow Communist Alfred Haag. Alfred was a member of the regional Parliament for the KPD until Adolf Hitler's rise to power in 1933.

Prison time

Both Lina and her husband were arrested and spent many years in prisons and concentration camps. Both Haags showed extraordinary strength of spirit during their incarcerations. Lina spent many years in Remand Prison, during which time she met other prominent prisoners such as Liselotte Herrmann. Lina was freed in 1938 after managing to turn her camp commandant at Lichtenburg against the Stuttgart Gestapo.

Alfred's release

Once released, she was reunited with her daughter, moved to Berlin, and secured a job. She visited the headquarters of the SS almost daily to petition for her husband's release. In 1940, she obtained permission for an audience with Heinrich Himmler, who secured Alfred's release from the Mauthausen concentration camp. Alfred survived physical torture while detained there and also at Dachau concentration camp.

Writing

Alfred was soon drafted into the Wehrmacht, and sent to the Eastern Front, and Lina and their daughter were bombed out of their home in Berlin. Lina was transferred to work in a hospital in Garmisch. While there, she wrote a memoir of her experiences in the form of an extended letter to Alfred, not knowing if she would ever see him again. The letter was eventually published in 1947 as A Handful of Dust or How Long the Night. Alfred was taken prisoner by the Red Army and eventually released in 1948.

Honours

The Haags lived in Munich until Alfred's death in 1982. In 2007, Lina was given the Dachau Award for Courage.

Death

On 18 June 2012, Haag died in Munich at the age of 105.

References

1907 births
2012 deaths
People from Ostalbkreis
People from the Kingdom of Württemberg
Communist Party of Germany politicians
German Communist Party politicians
Union of Persecutees of the Nazi Regime members
Communists in the German Resistance
German centenarians
Women centenarians
Nazi concentration camp survivors